The 2022–23 season is the 155th season in the existence of Sheffield Wednesday and the club's second consecutive season in League One. In addition to the league, they will also compete in the 2022–23 FA Cup, the 2022–23 EFL Cup and the 2022–23 EFL Trophy.

Season overview

June
On 20 June, the players reported back to pre-season training.

July
On 2 July, the club announced that manager Darren Moore would miss the first pre-season friendly against Alfreton Town due to recent knee surgery.

On 12 July,  the club unveiled their new kits for the 2022–23 season.

On 12 July, the club announced their new shirt sponsor Host & Stay Limited.

On 19 July, the club announced their first-team squad numbers for the 2022–23 season.

September
On 9 September, the fixture against Plymouth Argyle was postponed following the passing of Queen Elizabeth II.

On 16 September, Mark McGuinness was called up to the Republic of Ireland U21 squad.

On 30 September, James Shan joined the clubs coaching staff.

January
On 20 January, manager Darren Moore confirmed that ex-loan star, Michael Hector was currently on trial at the club.

February
On 14 February, following their 3-0 victory against Morecambe, the club broke their record for most clean sheets during a single league campaign breaking the previous record of 17.

On 24 February, Marvin Johnson was given a three-match suspension for violent conduct for an incident during the game against Ipswich Town.

On 25 February, following their 1-0 victoiry against Charlton Athletic, the club broke their unbeaten league record, breaking the previous record of 19 games unbeaten.

March
On 16 March, Pierce Charles was called up to the Northern Ireland U19 squad for their upcoming fixtures.

Pre-season
On 8 June, Wednesday announced their first pre-season friendly against Harrogate Town before heading off to Portugal for a warm weather training camp. On 13 June, the club announced that a Wednesday XI made up of U23 and U18 players will face Wakefield. On 16 June, a friendly against Alfreton Town was announced. Additional friendlies against Wigan Athletic and Rayo Vallecano were announced on 1 July. A behind-closed-doors friendly against Bournemouth during their pre-season trip to Portugal was announced on 2 July.

Competitions

League One

League table

Results summary

Results by round

Matches
On Thursday, 23 June 2022, the EFL League One fixtures were revealed.

FA Cup

Sheffield Wednesday were drawn at home to Morecambe in the first round and to Mansfield Town in the second round. On 28 November 2022, Sheffield Wednesday were drawn against Newcastle United in the third round. On 8 January 2023, Sheffield Wednesday were drawn at home to Fleetwood Town in the fourth round.

EFL Cup

Wednesday were drawn against Sunderland in the first round on 23 June 2022. The second round draw took place on 10 August 2022 by Clinton Morrison and Michael Gray in which Wednesday were drawn against Rochdale. The third round draw took place on 24 August 2022 and Sheffield Wednesday were drawn against Southampton.

EFL Trophy

The Owls were drawn into Group H of the Northern section alongside Bradford City, Burton Albion and Leicester City U21.

Transfers and contracts

In

Out

Loans in

Loans out

Contracts

Squad statistics

Appearances 

|-
|colspan="12" style="text-align:center;" |Out on loan
|-

|-
|colspan="12" style="text-align:center;" |No longer at the club

|}

Goalscorers

Includes all competitive matches.

Disciplinary record

Clean sheets

Awards

Club Player of the Month
Player of the Month awards for the 2022–23 season.

Sky Bet League One Player of the Month

EFL Goal of the Month

Sky Bet League One Manager of the Month

EFL League Cup Player of the Round

EFL League Cup Goal of the Round

References 

Sheffield Wednesday
Sheffield Wednesday F.C. seasons